The 1965 FA Charity Shield was the 43rd FA Charity Shield, an annual football match played between the winners of the previous season's First Division and FA Cup competitions. The match was played on 14 August 1965 at Old Trafford, Manchester and contested by Manchester United, who had won the 1964–65 First Division, and Liverpool, who had won the 1964–65 FA Cup. The teams played out a 2–2 draw and shared the Charity Shield.

Match details

See also
1964–65 Football League
1964–65 FA Cup

References

1965
FA Charity Shield
Charity Shield 1965
Charity Shield 1965
Charity Shield 1965